Jason Williams (born July 19, 1984) is a Bermudian football player, who currently plays for North Village Rams.

Career

Club
Williams began his professional club career with Southampton Rangers, before moving to the North Village Rams as of 2001, of which he is currently the starting goalkeeper in the Bermudian Premier Division.

Williams has been part of the Bermuda Hogges squad in the USL Second Division from 2007 through 2009.

In October 2011, Williams scored his first career goal for Village against Devonshire Cougars directly from a goalkick.

International
He made his senior international debut for Bermuda in a December 2007 friendly match against Saint Kitts and Nevis and earned a total of 4 caps. He has so far not represented his country in any FIFA World Cup qualification match.

His most recent international match was friendly match against Barbados in June 2008.

References

External links

1984 births
Living people
Association football goalkeepers
Bermudian footballers
Bermuda international footballers
Bermuda Hogges F.C. players
North Village Rams players
USL Second Division players